Gunilla Wallengren (born 2 May 1979) is a Swedish Paralympic athlete who competes in middle-distance events in international level events. She has won the Great North Run four times.

References

1979 births
Living people
Paralympic athletes of Sweden
Female wheelchair racers
Athletes (track and field) at the 2008 Summer Paralympics
Athletes (track and field) at the 2012 Summer Paralympics
Athletes (track and field) at the 2016 Summer Paralympics
Swedish wheelchair racers
People from Vänersborg Municipality
Sportspeople from Västra Götaland County